Eusurculus is a species of viviparous brotula.

Species
There are currently three recognized species in this genus:
 Eusurculus andamanensis Schwarzhans & Møller, 2007
 Eusurculus pistillum Schwarzhans & Møller, 2007
 Eusurculus pristinus Schwarzhans & Møller, 2007

References

Bythitidae